.es (españa) is the country code top-level domain (ccTLD) for Spain. It is administered by the Network Information Centre of Spain.

Registrations are permitted at the second level or at the third level beneath various generic second level categories. Some qualifications and restrictions apply to third-level registrations depending on which second-level domain they are within.  Second-level registrations have had some limitations including requiring registrants to have a connection with Spain, but these restrictions were lifted in a multi-stage process completed by the end of 2005, at which point registrations at the second level of .es were open to anybody worldwide.

The .es domain does not have a conventional WHOIS server operating on port 43, but WHOIS queries can be made using a page on ESNIC's website.

Second-level domains
There also exist a number of second-level domains:
 .com.es - open to all applicants (intended for commercial entities)
 .nom.es - open to all applicants (intended for personal names)
 .org.es - open to all applicants (intended for noncommercial organizations)
 .gob.es - for governmental entities
 .edu.es - for educational institutions

Alternatives
Until the liberalization in November 2005, registering in .es was expensive and encumbered compared to other ccTLDs. The second-level word had to be either a trade mark valid in Spain, the exact name of the registering business or association, or the first name and at least the first surname of the registering individual. Common words and placenames were unregisterable. There was also a requirement of a minimum of three characters in the name, though some exceptions like hp.es (Hewlett-Packard Spain) and pp.es (People's Party) were allowed. As an alternative many Spanish organizations registered under .com, .org or .net.

Usage
Although very popular in Spain for its intended use, .es has been used for domain hacks such as geociti.es, a website mirroring Geocities; adspac.es, a mobile-based advertising firm; thelettervsixtim.es, for the game VVVVVV; and iTun.es for iTunes Ping URL shortening.

References

External links
 IANA .es whois information
 ESNIC website 

Country code top-level domains
Internet in Spain
Council of European National Top Level Domain Registries members
Computer-related introductions in 1988